Victor Berglund (born 2 August 1999) is a Swedish professional ice hockey defenceman who is currently playing under contract with HIFK in the Liiga. He was drafted 195th overall by the Boston Bruins in the seventh round of the 2017 NHL Entry Draft.

Playing career

Europe 

As a youth, Berglund played junior hockey for Modo Hockey junior team in the J20 SuperElit, winning a silver medal with the team in the 2017 Junior Club World Cup. 

Berglund spent part of the 2016–17 season with Modo of the HockeyAllsvenskan, the second-tier Swedish ice hockey league, scoring one assist in 12 games. He continued to play 37 games for Modo in the 2017–18 season, making one goal and six assists and during the season, and was briefly loaned to Örnsköldsviks HF of the third-tier HockeyEttan for two games. For the 2018–19 season, Berglund played 50 games for Modo, with four goals and nine assists. He improved to 52 games played with ten goals and 12 assists for the 2019–20 season.

North America 

The Boston Bruins drafted Berglund 195th overall in the seventh round in the 2017 NHL Entry Draft. 

On 5 April 2019, he made his North American professional debut with Boston's AHL affiliate, the Providence Bruins in a 8–6 win against the Bridgeport Sound Tigers, scoring his first AHL goal. The Bruins signed him to a three-year entry-level contract on 15 June 2020. 

For the 2020–21 season, the Bruins loaned Berglund to Luleå HF of the Swedish Hockey League, where he played 50 games with four goals and 17 assists. He returned to the Providence Bruins for the 2021–22 AHL season.

Returning to the Providence Bruins to begin the 2022–23 season, Berglund appeared in just 5 regular season games through three months before he was placed on unconditional waivers by the Boston Bruins in order for a mutual termination of his contract on 8 December 2022.

Return to Europe
On 10 December 2022, Berglund returned to Europe and secured a contract for the remainder of the season with Finnish club, HIFK of the Liiga.

Career statistics

References

External links 

 

1999 births
Living people
Boston Bruins draft picks
HIFK (ice hockey) players
Luleå HF players
Maine Mariners (ECHL) players
Modo Hockey players
Sportspeople from Västernorrland County
People from Örnsköldsvik Municipality
Providence Bruins players
Swedish ice hockey defencemen